Crnjelovo Gornje is a small village located north of the city of Bijeljina in Republika Srpska, Bosnia and Herzegovina.

Notable residents
Georgije Đokić

References

External links
 Bijeljina official website (Serbian)  

Bijeljina
Populated places in Bijeljina